Pteris vittata, commonly known variously as the Chinese brake, Chinese ladder brake, or simply ladder brake, is a fern species in the Pteridoideae subfamily of the Pteridaceae. It is indigenous to Asia, southern Europe, tropical Africa and Australia. The type specimen was collected in China by Pehr Osbeck.

Habitat and distribution

Pteris vittata is native and widespread in the paleotropics: found from the east, to the south tropical, and southern Africa (in Angola; Kenya; Lesotho; Malawi; Mozambique; Namibia; Tanzania (including the Zanzibar Archipelago); Cape Province, Free State, KwaZulu-Natal, and Transvaal in South Africa; Eswatini; Uganda; Zambia; and Zimbabwe); temperate and tropical Asia (in the provinces of Anhui, Gansu, Guangdong, Guangxi, Guizhou, Hubei, Jiangxi, Sichuan, Xizang, and Yunnan in China; the prefectures of Honshu, Kyushu, Shikoku, and the Ryukyu Islands of Japan; and Thailand); and Australia, in the states of New South Wales, Queensland, Victoria, and Western Australia.

Pteris vittata is often associated with limestone habitats. It may be seen growing on concrete structures and cracks, in buildings in the central business district and suburbs of Sydney, Australia. It is an introduced species in California, Texas, and the Southeastern United States.

A remnant population exists in the Italian peninsula, in Sicily, Calabria and Campania.

Uses
Although it grows readily in the wild, Pteris vittata is sometimes cultivated. It is grown in gardens for its attractive appearance, or used in pollution control schemes: it is known to be a hyperaccumulator plant of arsenic used in phytoremediation.

Suggested reading
 Cong Tu and  Lena Q. Ma; Effects of Arsenic Concentrations and Forms on Arsenic Uptake by the Hyperaccumulator Ladder Brake, Journal of Environmental Quality  Vol. 31 No. 2, p. 641-647 (résumé)

References

External links 

vittata
Ferns of Asia
Ferns of Africa
Flora of Indomalesia
Plants described in 1753
Flora of East Tropical Africa
Flora of South Tropical Africa
Flora of Southern Africa
Ferns of Australia
Flora of New South Wales
Flora of Queensland
Flora of Victoria (Australia)
Flora of Western Australia
Indomalayan realm flora
Flora of China
Flora of Japan
Flora of the Ryukyu Islands
Flora of Lebanon
Flora of Thailand
Phytoremediation plants
Taxa named by Carl Linnaeus